The 1922 Cal Aggies football team represented the Northern Branch of the College of Agriculture—now known as the University of California, Davis—as an independent during the 1922 college football season. The team was known as the Cal Aggies or California Aggies. Led by Chester Brewer in his first and only season as head caoch, the Cal Aggies compiled a record of 3–4–2 and outscored their opponents 178 to 53 for the season. The Cal Aggies played home games in Davis, California.

Schedule

Notes

References

Cal Aggies
UC Davis Aggies football seasons
Cal Aggies football